Düyərli or Dugyarli or Dugyarly or Dyugyarli or Dyukyarli may refer to:
 Düyərli, Shamkir, Azerbaijan
 Düyərli, Tartar, Azerbaijan